Mohamed Ali Ghariani (born 11 June 1983) is a Tunisian former professional footballer who played as a striker.

External links
 

1983 births
Living people
Association football forwards
Tunisian footballers
Tunisia international footballers
Tunisian expatriate footballers
Expatriate footballers in Turkey
Expatriate footballers in France
Ligue 2 players
ES Zarzis players
MKE Ankaragücü footballers
Tours FC players
Club Africain players
CS Hammam-Lif players
AS Gabès players